Andy Selva (born 23 May 1976) is a Sammarinese former footballer and current manager of Tre Fiori. During his playing career he played as a forward and captained the San Marino national team, finishing his career as their record goal scorer.

Club career
He began his career in 1994–95, playing in the Eccellenza with A.S. Latina, in which he scored five goals in 26 appearances. The following season, he produced 10 goals in 31 appearances in Civita Castellana in Serie D, before moving to Fano (Serie C2), where he remained until March 1998, he played 32 games with only one goal. In 1999, Selva played with another Serie C2 club, Catanzaro, making 40 appearances, scoring six goals.

Selva went back to the Eccellenza with Tivoli in 1999, which he scored 15 goals in 21 matches, while for the following season, he moved to San Marino, where he scored four goals in 26 appearances. In the 2001–02 season playing in three different teams, he collected three appearances with San Marino, then five with Maceratese in Serie D, scoring a goal, and thus finishing the season in Serie D, with Grosseto (15 appearances and two goals). He scored 21 goals in 30 games for Bellaria in the following season.

In the summer of 2003, he transferred to SPAL 1907 where, in two seasons in Serie C1 he plays 51 games scoring 22 goals. In 2005–06, he moved to Padova (Serie C1), who sold him to Sassuolo after only scoring two goals in 20 games. With Sassuolo, he played two years in Serie C1 and played an important part in the historic breakthrough with a Serie B promotion, contributing decisively with 11 goals in and became the top scorer in Group A.

In mid-2009, he left for Hellas Verona but was released after Verona were promoted to Serie B.

In July 2011, he trained with Santarcangelo.

He announced his retirement as a player in July 2018.

International career
Selva was born in Rome, Italy to an Italian father from Lazio and a Sammarinese mother, which made him eligible to represent Italy or San Marino and he chose for the latter.

He made his international debut on 9 September 1997 against Turkey U-21, and scored one goal for his team in 1–4 loss.

As one of the few professional practitioners of the sport in the country, he is hailed one of the greatest players in the history of the San Marino national side. He appeared 74 times for the national team and scored eight goals, making him the leading goalscorer in the history of the team. Until 2012, he was the only player to score more than one goal for San Marino.

On 28 April 2004, Selva became the first player ever to score a winning goal for San Marino when he netted the only goal in a 1–0 friendly win over Liechtenstein, which is the only win that San Marino have recorded to date, as well as one of four official matches where San Marino have kept a clean sheet.

Managerial career
After his retirement, he was announced as the head coach of San Marino national under-17 football team. In February 2020, he was appointed as manager of Campionato Sammarinese side Pennarossa. On 13 June 2022, he was appointed as head coach of Sanmarinese team Tre Fiori. On 7 July 2022, he led the team to their first ever away win in a European competition (and the first of any Sanmarinese team), with a 1–0 win over Luxembourgish team Fola Esch. A week later, Tre Fiori beat Fola Esch 3–1 in the return leg, resulting in them qualifying for the 2nd qualifying round of the UEFA Europa Conference League for the first time, and advancing in a European competition for only the second time ever.

Career statistics

Club

International
Score and Result lists San Marino's goals first.

References

External links
 
 
 
 
 
 Andy Selva at RSSSF

1976 births
Living people
Footballers from Rome
Sammarinese footballers
San Marino international footballers
Italian footballers
Sammarinese people of Italian descent
Italian people of Sammarinese descent
Association football forwards
Serie C players
Serie B players
U.S. Catanzaro 1929 players
A.S.D. Victor San Marino players
F.C. Grosseto S.S.D. players
A.C. Bellaria Igea Marina players
S.P.A.L. players
Calcio Padova players
U.S. Sassuolo Calcio players
Hellas Verona F.C. players
Sammarinese expatriate footballers
Sammarinese expatriate sportspeople in Italy
Expatriate footballers in Italy
S.S. Maceratese 1922 players